Michele Visentin (born 13 December 1991) is an Italian rugby union player. His usual position is as a winger, and he currently plays for Zebre.

In January 2015, Visentin was named in the Italian squad for the 2015 Six Nations Championship.

References

External links
ESPN Profile

1991 births
Living people
Italian rugby union players
Italy international rugby union players
Zebre Parma players
Rugby union wings